Michael Behrens (born 1973 in Düsseldorf, Germany) is a German sculptor working with glass. He operates internationally, mainly in Europe and North America.

Life 
Michael Behrens, grown up in Neuss, lives and works in Düsseldorf, Germany. From 1999 to 2003 Behrens studied at the Academy of Fine Arts in Maastricht, Netherlands where he graduated with a bachelor's degree in 2003 .

In 2004 and 2007, Behrens worked as a project supervisor for Ethiopian Reflections in Addis Abeba, Ethiopia. In 2008 and 2009, he was assigned as a lecturer at the Faculty of Architecture – Plastic Shaping at the Technical University (TU) Darmstadt.

Behrens regularly participates in international art fairs such as the Art Palm Beach (Florida, US), Form Miami (Florida, US), SOFA Chicago (Illinois, US), Pan Amsterdam (Netherlands), Art Breda (Netherlands), Art Vienna (Austria), Art & Antique Hofburg (Austria) and Art Münster (Germany). His work is part of public collections like the Museum Kunst Palast in Düsseldorf/Germany, the Ernsting Stiftung in Coesfeld/Germany, the Imagine Museum in Saint Petersburg, the Novotný Museum in Nový Bor, the MusVerre in Sars-Poteries and the Seven Bridges Foundation in Greenwich/Connecticut/US.

Art 
Michael Behrens began experimenting with sculpture in 2002. Behrens’s sculptural work initially focused primarily on the internal structure of the objects. His Seaforms series focuses more on the form of the outer shape. In Phoenix, the artist devotes himself to the abstracted form of the object. The relationship between shape and content is of high importance in Behrens's work.

Series 
Phoenix

In Phoenix the sculpture is reduced to a minimal form and then extra care is provided for whereby its plasticity comes to the fore. Behrens produces contrasting works made of crystal by deliberate abandonment of color in the classical sense and the interplay of convex and concave surfaces in black and gold.

Seaforms

The Seaforms series embodies decades of Behrens’s personal sensory experiences above and below water. The diverse color range and interior movement varies as if created organically by the environment while each shape and structure provide a strong appearance. The natural and random appearance of the artist’s works is created by the exterior form and the specific details: The fine modeling of the subareas and edges, the interplay of matt and polished surfaces as well as the cell-like structures emerging from fusing of the glass sections.

Landscapes

In addition to glass objects, Behrens furthermore creates two-dimensional works abstracting photo material from satellite images and maps.

Technique 

Behrens produces all artworks in his studio in Düsseldorf where to find his custom-built furnaces. Each piece undergoes several complex production phases: The sculptural work on a rigid foam model, the production of the melting molds, the arrangement of pre-processed glass pieces in the melting mold, the actual melting and cooling processes as well as the finish by grinding, polishing and/or sandblasting. The production of a single sculpture usually takes several months.

Awards 
 Fort Wayne Museum Award, 42nd Annual International Glass Invitational Award Exhibition, with Habatat Galleries Michigan, US, 2014
 Frederik Meijer Award 41st Annual International Glass Invitational Award Exhibition", with Habatat Galleries Michigan, US, 2013
 Collector's Choice 40th Annual International Glass Invitational Award Exhibition, with Habatat Galleries Michigan, US, 2012
 Kalamazoo Institute of Arts Award, 39th Annual International Glass Invitational Award Exhibition, with Habatat Galleries Michigan, US, 2011
 1st Prize, Arts and Crafts state award North Rhine-Westphalia, Kevelaer, Germany, 2009
 3rd Immenhäuser Glass Award, Germany, 2009
 Jutta Cuny-Franz Memorial Award Selected Entries, Germany, 2009
 1st Prize Glass Art Prize Glasveredler 2008 Glasstec, Germany, 2008
 Innovation Glass Art Prize Weru, Germany, 2007

Selected exhibitions 
 2019: Continuum Gallery, Königswinter, Germany, Solo Show
 2019: Barbara Achilles Foundation, Hamburg, Germany, Solo Show
 2019: Schantz Galleries, Stockbridge, Massachusetts, US, Group Show
 2018: Cini Foundation, Venice, Italy, Group Show
 2018: Fort Wayne Museum of Art, Fort Wayne, Indiana, US, Group Show
 2017: Habatat Galleries, Royal Oak, Michigan, US, Solo Show
 2017: Etienne Gallery Oisterwijk, Netherlands, Solo Show
 2016: Ernsting Foundation, New Additions 2015, Coesfeld, Germany, Group Show
 2016: Plateaux Gallery, London, United Kingdom, Group Show
 2015: Sikabonyi Gallery, Vienna, Austria, Solo Show
 2015: Sandra Ainsley Gallery, Toronto, Canada, Group Show
 2014: Etienne Gallery Oisterwijk, Netherlands, Solo Show
 2014: Novotný Museum, Nový Bor, Czech Republic, Group Show
 2013: Museum Kunstpalast, Düsseldorf, Germany, Group Show
 2013: Frederik Meijer Gardens & Sculpture Park, Grand Rapids, Michigan, US, Group Show
 2012: Continuum Gallery, Königswinter, Germany, Solo Show
 2012: LWL – Museum, Glashütte Gernheim, Germany, Group Show
 2010: Van Loon Gallery, Vucht, Netherlands, Solo Show
 2010: Museum Kunstpalast, Düsseldorf, Germany, Group Show
 2008: Ernsting Foundation, Coesfeld, Germany, Solo Show

Bibliography 
 Continuum Gallery (2019). Michael Behrens - Phoenix & Seaforms. Königswinter/Germany, 
 Dr Ricke, Helmut (2008). Underwaterworld & Icebergs – Michael Behrens & Peter Bremers. Exhibition catalogue, Ernsting Stiftung
 Glasmuseum Hentrich (2008). Recent acquisitions of glass sculpture at the Glasmuseum Hentrich. Glasmuseum Hentrich
 Dr von Kerssenbrock-Krosigk,Dedo. Michael Behrens (2009).The Burlington Magazine, Issue 1275, Vol. 151, pp. 394/95
 Stiftung Museum Kunstpalast (2010). GLASpekte – Künstler aus Nordrhein-Westfahlen in Dialog mit Arbeiten aus dem Glasmuseum Hentrich. Stiftung Museum Kunst Palast
 Elliott, Kate; Rogers, Michael; Jeff Wallin, Jeff (2010). E-Merge 2010 – A Showcase of Rising Talents in Kiln-Glass. Bullseye Glass
 LWL-Indutriemuseum (2012). Rotation SiO2 – 200 Jahre Glashütte Gernheim. Klartext Press, 
 Dr Ricke, Helmut (2012). Seaforms & Landscapes – Michael Behrens. Continuum Gallery 
 Dr Ricke, Helmut (2012). Inspiration from the Deep Sea and Outer Space. Neues Glas, Issue 3, pp. 36–43
 Hampson, Ferdinand (2014). Studio Glass Evolving. American Art Collector, Issue 109, pp. 171–174
 Sikabonyi, Andre (2015). Seaforms & Landscapes, Vernissage, Issue 324, pp. 14–17
 Habatat Galleries (2015). The Creative Process – 43rd International Catalogue,  
 Ernsting Stiftung Alter Hof Herding (2016). Wer Hätte das gedacht! Coesfeld-Lette/Germany, 
 Habatat Galleries (2016). Insight – 44th International Invitational Award Exhibition. Royal Oak/MI/US, 
 Habatat Galleries (2017). NEXT – 45th International Invitational Award Exhibition. Royal Oak/MI/US, 
 Habatat Galleries (2017). Solid Thoughts. Royal Oak/MI/US, . online catalog

External links 
 Website Michael Behrens

References 

Living people
21st-century German sculptors
21st-century German male artists
German male sculptors
Artists from Düsseldorf
German contemporary artists
German glass artists
1973 births